Smith's Castle, built in 1678, is a house museum at 55 Richard Smith Drive, near Wickford, a village in North Kingstown, Rhode Island, United States. Smith's Castle is one of the oldest houses in the state. It was designated a National Historic Landmark in 1993 as Cocumscussoc Archeological Site, due to the artifacts and information digs in the vicinity have yielded. It is located just off U.S. 1.

History
Smith's Castle was built in 1678 as a replacement for an earlier structure which was destroyed by the Narragansett Tribe during King Philip's War.  The land on which the house was built was known as Cocumscussoc (or Cocumscossoc) and near the original site of Roger Williams' trading post.  Williams was the founder of Rhode Island and a prominent Baptist theologian.  He built the trading post on the site in 1637 to trade with the Narragansetts after receiving the land from the tribe.  Eventually, Williams sold the trading post to Richard Smith to finance his trip to Great Britain to secure a charter for Rhode Island.

Smith bought the trading post and surrounding lands from Williams and constructed a large house which was fortified, giving the house its nickname as a castle.  His son Richard Smith Jr. inherited the plantation in 1666 and invited militias from Massachusetts and Connecticut to use the property during King Philip's War.  The house was burned in retaliation for the Great Swamp Fight, and the present structure was built in its place, originally as a saltbox house, and later modified into its current form.  Approximately 40 soldiers were buried on the property during King Philip's War. Additionally, the only incident of an individual being hanged, drawn, and quartered for treason on American soil took place at Smith's Castle in 1676.  Joshua Tefft, an English colonist found guilty of having fought on the side of the Narragansetts during the Great Swamp Fight, was executed by this method.

Eventually, the property was transferred to the Updike, Congdon, and Fox families. Among the Updikes who lived there were Lodowick and Abigail Updike, whose daughter Sarah Updike Goddard and grandchildren Mary Katherine Goddard and William Goddard were all notable colonial-era printers and publishers. It was the site of a large dairy farm into the twentieth century until it became a museum. In the early twentieth century, preservationists Norman Isham and John Hutchins Cady stabilized the house and performed several minor restorations.

A slab table belonging to Lodowick Updike is currently in the Newport Restoration Foundation in Newport, Rhode Island. The table was possibly made by John Goddard in the 1760s at Goddard and Townsend.

See also

List of the oldest buildings in Rhode Island
List of National Historic Landmarks in Rhode Island
National Register of Historic Places listings in Washington County, Rhode Island

References

External links

Smith's Castle official website
Richard Smith information

Images

Houses on the National Register of Historic Places in Rhode Island
National Historic Landmarks in Rhode Island
Historic house museums in Rhode Island
King Philip's War
Houses completed in 1678
Museums in Washington County, Rhode Island
U.S. Route 1
Archaeological sites in Rhode Island
Saltbox architecture in the United States
Houses in North Kingstown, Rhode Island
National Register of Historic Places in Washington County, Rhode Island
1678 establishments in Rhode Island